Tokachi Dam is a dam in Hokkaidō, Japan.

Dams in Hokkaido
Dams completed in 1984